The Lašva is a river in Central Bosnia, Bosnia and Herzegovina. It is a left tributary of the Bosna.

It originates from the confluence of two "little Lašvas", Karaulska Lašva and Komarska Lašva in Turbe. The Lašva flows through Travnik, then through Vitez before draining into the Bosna.

See also
Lašva Valley
Turbe
Travnik

References

Rivers of Bosnia and Herzegovina
Central Bosnia Canton